is a private university in Ebetsu, Hokkaido, Japan. Its predecessor, a vocational school, was founded in 1946. It was chartered as a junior college in 1950. A four-year college (Sapporo College of Commerce, 札幌商科大学) opened in 1968; it adopted the name Sapporo Gakuin University in 1984. The junior college was closed in 1979.

Faculties and departments

Undergraduate 
 Faculty of Commerce (hiring freeze in 2009)
 Department of Commerce
 Faculty of Business
 Department of Business
 Department of Accounting and Finance
 Faculty of Economics
 Department of Economics
 Faculty of Humanities
 Department of Human Science
 Department of English Language and Literature
 Department of Clinical Psychology
 Department of Child Development
 Faculty of Law
 Department of Law
 Faculty of Social Information
 Department of Social Information

Graduate schools 
 Graduate School of Law
 Graduate School of Clinical Psychology
 Graduate School of Regional Management

External links
 Official website 

Educational institutions established in 1946
Private universities and colleges in Japan
Universities and colleges in Hokkaido
1946 establishments in Japan
Hokkaido American Football Association